Ivan Righini, previously Ivan Vadimovich Bariev (born 16 April 1991) is a retired Italian competitive figure skater and current chorographer. He is a two-time Bavarian Open champion and a four-time Italian national champion. He has reached the free skate at four ISU Championships, achieving his best result, sixth, at the 2016 Europeans.

Competed for Russia as Ivan Bariev, he won four silver medals on the ISU Junior Grand Prix series, two Russian junior national titles, and bronze at the 2011 Golden Spin of Zagreb.

Personal life 
Ivan Bariev was born on 16 April 1991 in Moscow, Russia. In 2013, he adopted his mother's former surname, Righini. In addition to Russian, he also holds Italian citizenship. His brother, Filip, is ten years younger.

Career

Early career 
Bariev began learning to skate in 1994. He debuted on the ISU Junior Grand Prix (JGP) series in September 2007, winning silver medals in Romania and Croatia. In late October 2007, he underwent surgery on the meniscus in his right knee. He finished 7th at both the JGP Final and the 2008 World Junior Championships.

The following season, Bariev was awarded silver medals at JGP events in the Czech Republic and South Africa. He finished 4th at the JGP Final. His first senior international medal, bronze, came at the 2011 Golden Spin of Zagreb. He made his final competitive appearances for Russia in late October 2012, at the Cup of Nice.

2013–present 
In 2013, Righini stated his intention to compete for Italy. He received the Russian federation's permission in May 2013. The International Skating Union requires that skaters who change federations sit out a certain period of time. For Righini, this period ended on 29 October 2013.

Righini debuted for Italy at the 2013 Merano Cup, placing fifth, and then won bronze at the 2013 Golden Spin of Zagreb. After winning the men's title at the 2014 Italian Championships, he took gold at the 2014 Bavarian Open. Righini was selected for the 2014 World Championships in Saitama, Japan. Placing 14th in the short program, he qualified for the free skate, in which he placed 12th, and finished 13th overall.

Righini made his Grand Prix debut in the 2014–15 season. He received assignments to the 2014 Rostelecom Cup and 2014 NHK Trophy, then placed 11th and 10th, respectively.

Righini planned to start the 2015-16 season at the 2015 Nepela Trophy, but had to withdraw due to a foot injury. He withdrew from the 2015 Cup of Nice after the short program since his blade was broken during the warm-up.

Programs

Competitive highlights
GP: Grand Prix; CS: Challenger Series; JGP: Junior Grand Prix

For Italy

For Russia

References

External links

  
 

Italian male single skaters
Russian male single skaters
Russian emigrants to Italy
1991 births
Living people
Figure skaters from Moscow
Competitors at the 2011 Winter Universiade
Competitors at the 2017 Winter Universiade